Sokh District is a district of Uzbekistan's Fergana Region. It consists of two exclaves of Uzbekistan, surrounded by Kyrgyzstan. Despite being part of Uzbekistan, its population is almost entirely ethnic Tajiks. Its capital is the town of Ravon. The district consists of seven urban-type settlements (Ravon, Qalʻa, Sarikanda, Soʻx, Tul, Hushyor, Tarovatli) and four rural communities (Sohibkor, Ravon, Soʻx, Hushyor). Another village in the district is Limbur.

Geography 
The territory of Sokh is divided into two parts, separated by Kyrgyzstan:
 Soʻx (or Sokh or Southern Sokh or Upper Sokh), which is much more extensive than Northern Sokh. The area encompasses nineteen localities with an urban population of 65.9 percent and a rural population of 34.1 percent. It is 99 percent Tajik, 0.7 percent Kyrgyz and 0.3 percent Uzbek.
The exclave is surrounded by the Kyrgyz Batken Region.

 Chon Qora-Qalacha (or Chongara-Qalacha or Northern Sokh or Lower Sokh), comprising the villages of Chon-Qora (Chongara) and Qalacha.

Population 
, the population is 80,600. Despite being a part of Uzbekistani territory and being surrounded by Kyrgyzstan, its population is mostly Tajik.

History 

Together with Kokand, Sokh was one of the centres of the Basmachi uprising from 1918 to 1924. At that time, Sokh was still directly connected with Uzbekistan. 

Sokh was created in 1955. Local legend holds that “the territory was lost by a Kyrgyz Communist Party official in a card game with his Uzbek counterpart.” Others say it made sense to assign the area to Uzbekistan because the roads running along the Sokh river connected to Uzbekistan to the north rather than going through the rugged Kyrgyz territory to the east and west of the area in question.

In 1999, Uzbekistan claimed that militants from the Islamic Movement of Uzbekistan (IMU) were using Sokh as their base to attack Uzbekistan and Kyrgyzstan. Earlier that year, Tashkent had been rocked by a series of car bombings attributed to the IMU. Uzbekistan began mining the borders around Sokh, angering the Kyrgyz who claim Uzbekistan placed mines on its territory.

Economy 
The economy of Sokh is mainly based on agriculture (potatoes and fruits). The fields are supplied by the river Sokh so that agriculture is only possible in the valley plain. The Sokh valley forms a river oasis in the surrounding, barren grassland. The seasonal migration of the male labour force to Russia is also important. The exclave contains twenty-eight schools, two colleges, three clinics, twelve dispensaries and ten village health centres.

See also
Sokh (river)
Shohimardon, an Uzbekistan exclave in Kyrgyzstan
Sarvan, a Tajikistan exclave in Uzbekistan
Vorukh, a Tajikistan exclave in Kyrgyzstan
Batken Region enclaves and exclaves

References

External links
Kirgizia-Uzbekistan enclave Sokh 

Districts of Uzbekistan
Fergana Region
Enclaves and exclaves